Amnesia is a one-off British crime drama television mini-series broadcast on ITV1 in March 2004, starring John Hannah as the protagonist, D.S. Mackenzie Stone, whose wife disappeared without trace three months ago. Written by Chris Lang and directed by Nicholas Laughland, the series gathered an average of 4m viewers.

The DVD of the series was released on 4 October 2004, a week prior to broadcast. In the United States, the series aired on PBS as part of the Masterpiece Mystery! block of programming.

Plot
Part 1
D.S. Mackenzie Stone (John Hannah) is distraught after his wife's sudden disappearance on their fifth wedding anniversary, and strives tirelessly to discover what has happened to her. He has very little memory of what happened on the night she disappeared, and struggles to comprehend any reason as to why she took off, except for brief flashbacks and terrible nightmares. Three months on, whilst constantly searching through missing persons reports, Stone comes across two cases: one involving a man named Paul West, who was reported missing after his wife and son were killed in a house fire, and the other the mysterious John Dean (Anthony Calf), an IT consultant who has lost his memory for unknown reasons and that he moved into the town only days after the fire. Stone is convinced that Dean is actually West, and that he murdered his wife and stepson.  Meanwhile, Dean is looking for information to help him find out exactly who he was before he lost his memory. He is asked to take part in an experiment for a memory treatment that shows great promise. At first he refuses, unsure that he wants to rediscover his past as he is happily married to Jenna (Jemma Redgrave), and has a good life - but deciding they need the money, agrees to do it.

Part 2
While Stone doggedly continues his investigation into John Dean's mysterious past, his colleagues begin to harbour serious suspicions about his involvement in his wife's disappearance, but without proof, they can do no more than keep a discreet eye on him. D.C. Ian Reid (Brendan Coyle) becomes convinced that Stone has murdered his wife. Stone, meanwhile, is determined to convince Reid to visit John Dean, convinced that Dean, as West, killed his wife and child and has more than likely killed before - and could be involved in the disappearance of his own wife. Stone is determined to solve the mystery and bring Dean to justice - but before he can prove his guilt, Stone finds himself in a surprising encounter with Dean's wife, Jenna.

Cast
 John Hannah as D.S. Mackenzie Stone
 Jemma Redgrave as Jenna Dean
 Anthony Calf as John Dean
 Patrick Malahide as D.I. Michael Brennan
 Brendan Coyle as D.C. Ian Reid
 Jeremy Child as Dr. Mark Denton
 Rupert Farley as D.I. Mick Challoner
 Beatriz Batarda as Lucia Stone
 Lolita Chakrabarti as Parminder Kelsey

Critical reception
The Guardian said of the series; "Amnesia uncovered so many victims of just one industrious serial killer that he must have started bumping off his wives at about the same time as he was sitting his common entrance exams. John Hannah starred as a cop called Mac who was attempting to cope with a disappeared wife whom, it transpired he may or may not have offed in moment of extreme insobriety. But Mac had not only carelessly misplaced his flashback wife, he was also in danger of losing his memory, his mind and his job, though not necessarily in that order. Instead of taking a sabbatical and having an affair with his therapist, Mac decided to follow a hunch about an alleged fellow amnesia sufferer called John Dean, who had wandered into an A&E department a few years ago claiming he didn't know who he was. Was Dean, now happily married to Jenna, really a murderer called Paul West? And before that, had he been a murderer called something else?

You might have thought that wandering into an A&E department claiming you didn't know who you were would attract a tiny bit of attention, possibly from the News of the World, but no - luckily for those who promulgate Extreme Plot Implausibility, nobody other than a fusty old professor was remotely interested in Dean's bonkers old brain until Mac came along. However, in a denouement that would have been rejected by the producers of Acorn Antiques as being a wee bit on the wobbly side, Dean's guilt was established by a series of random character traits: he liked the Pretenders, he had a nut allergy and he was red-green colour blind. These were all the sort of things a reasonably attentive wife might have picked up on over the years unless, like Jenna, she was the tragic victim of Extreme Plot Implausibility Syndrome by Proxy, a tragic condition which can lead to a beloved husband attempting to turf you out of the marital yacht and into the English Channel as soon as you stumble across his cache of forged passports."

References

2004 British television series debuts
2004 British television series endings
2000s British drama television series
ITV television dramas
English-language television shows
British detective television series
2000s British crime television series